Eduard Kojnok (14 August 1933 in Veľká Suchá – 27 October 2011 in Rožňava) was the Roman Catholic bishop of the Roman Catholic Diocese of Rožňava, Slovakia.

Ordained to the priesthood in 1956, Kojnok became bishop of the Rožňava Diocese in 1990; he retired in 2008.

Notes

21st-century Roman Catholic bishops in Slovakia
1933 births
2011 deaths
People from Poltár District
20th-century Roman Catholic bishops in Slovakia